Strava is an American internet service for tracking physical exercise which incorporates social network features. It is mostly used for cycling and running using Global Positioning System data. Strava uses a freemium model with some features only available in the paid subscription plan. The service was founded in 2009 by Mark Gainey and Michael Horvath and is based in San Francisco, California.

Overview

Strava records data for a user's activities, which can then be shared with the user's followers or shared publicly. If an activity is shared publicly, Strava automatically groups activities that occur at the same time and place (such as taking part in a marathon, sportive or group ride). An activity's recorded information may include a route summary, elevation (net and unidirectional), speed (average, minimum, maximum), timing (total and moving time), power and heart rate. Activities can be recorded using the mobile app or from devices manufactured by third parties like Garmin, Google Fit, Suunto, and Wahoo. Activities can also be entered manually via the Strava website.

Strava Metro, a program marketed towards city planners, uses cycling data from Strava users in supported cities and regions.

History 

Strava, which means "strive" in Swedish, was founded in 2009. Cofounders Michael Horvath and Mark Gainey first met in the 1980s as members of Harvard University's rowing crew.

Initially popular with cyclists and eventually runners, by 2017 over 1 billion activities had been uploaded to the service. By 2020, Strava had more than 50 million users and three billion activities had been uploaded.

In March 2022, Strava stopped operating in Russia and Belarus because of the Russian invasion of Ukraine. In May 2022, Strava announced the company had acquired injury prevention app Recover Athletics. Strava included the services and breadth of injury prevention resources in the form of Recover Athletics content in their Subscription package, including personalised prehab and injury prevention exercise plans.

In early 2023, Strava significantly raised subscription prices in many markets—some more than doubling. A month earlier, the company laid off approximately 14% of its workforce. The company's last venture capital funding was a $110 million Series F in 2020. In January 2023 Strava also acquired Fatmap, a company focused on building high-resolution 3D maps used for outdoor activities, with a long-term goal to integrate Fatmap’s core platform into Strava itself.

In February 2023, founder and current CEO Michael Horvath announced he will resign, citing the need to find a new CEO who was better at their job.

Features and tools 
Strava incorporates social media features which allow users to post their exercises to followers. Alongside a GPS map of their exercise users can also post pictures and videos. Followers can then comment on posts and give 'kudos' in the form of a like button.

Beacon is a feature that allows Strava users to share their location real time with anyone they choose to, and nominate others as a safety contact for their workout. Other premium features include access to custom route-building tools and access to map segment leaderboards. Subscription users also have access to Recover Athletics personalised rehab and injury prevention exercise plans.

Strava maintains a system of leaderboards that show the most frequent runners or riders on a segment, as well as the fastest times by activity type. These fastest segment times (also known as KOMs, for "King of the Mountain") have been widely criticized for including times by athletes banned for doping, as well as fake times logged by motorized vehicles and other forms of cheating. In response, Strava released tools for users to report suspicious activities.

Privacy concerns

In November 2017, Strava published a "Global Heatmap"—a "visualization of two years of trailing data from Strava's global network of athletes." In January 2018, an Australian National University student studying international security discovered that this map had mapped military bases, including known U.S. bases in Syria, and forward operating bases in Afghanistan, and HMNB Clyde—a Royal Navy base that contains the United Kingdom's nuclear arsenal. The findings led to continued scrutiny over privacy issues associated with fitness services and other location-aware applications; Strava's CEO James Quarles stated that the company was "committed to working with military and government officials" on the issue, and would be reviewing its features and simplifying its privacy settings. Although users can now opt out of having their data aggregated on the global heatmap, the original data that contains sensitive information has been archived on GitHub. 

A separate security flaw was reported in June 2022 that allowed the identification and tracking of security personnel working at military bases in Israel. Distinct from the previous heatmap issue, this vulnerability relied on Strava's segments feature.

References

External links
 
 Strava Heatmap

GPS sports tracking applications
Mobile software
Companies based in San Francisco
Fitness apps
Proprietary cross-platform software
2009 software
American companies established in 2009
2009 establishments in California